Nor Sanavongsay (born February 28, 1975) is an American writer and illustrator in the San Francisco Bay area and the founder of Sahtu Press, Inc.

Family and early years
The Sanavongsay family came to the United States in the aftermath of the Laotian Civil War. Nor Sanavongsay initially resettled with his parents, one brother, and one sister in the town of Kingsport, Tennessee in 1979. He was four years old at the time. They were sponsored by the First Presbyterian Church of Kingsport, Tennessee. In August 1979 they relocated to Elgin, Illinois, where he would spend the next 30 years.

He grew up watching Transformers, Bruce Lee movies, Thundercats, and other cartoons of the 1980s. He also had a fascination with comic books and graphic novels. He began drawing at the age of six with his uncle as a mentor. He honed his artistic skills as the years passed by, and he initially went to Northern Illinois University to study to be an illustrator. He eventually changed his major to web design, graduating in 1998.

Community service and professional career
He has actively been involved as a volunteer with the SatJaDham Lao Literary Project, the National Lao American Writers Summit, the Lao Artists Festival of Elgin, Legacies of War, the Center for Lao Studies, the Lao Heritage Foundation, Laos in the House, and the Kinnaly Dance Troupe, among many others. In 2013, he founded Sahtu Press, Inc., a nonprofit publishing company with the mission to promote Lao literature.

Professionally, he has worked for companies including Encyclopædia Britannica, Sears, Zoosk, Barnes & Noble and currently Workday, Inc.

Art and writing
He is the author of the 2013 children's book A Sticky Mess inspired by classic Lao folktales, particularly that of the folk hero Xieng Mieng. In interviews he noted that it took nearly 14 years to finally get the book to publication and that it had gone through many iterations. He has announced intentions for a three-book series over the next ten years. The first run of the book's publication was funded through Kickstarter.

Nor Sanavongsay is also at work developing the children's book series Kiwi the Green Koala with Dr. Poe Phetthongsy, a graphic novel and a website to help people learn about storytelling.

Recently, he has been sharing examples of his work depicting the classical Lao legends of the Kinnaly, his original characters and concepts, some fan art and most things Lao related on various Social Media platform.

Publications
 A Sticky Mess, by Nor Sanavongsay (Sahtu Press, Inc., Nov 2013), 
 Mommy Eats Fried Grasshoppers, Art by Nor Sanavongsay (Sahtu Press, Inc., Nov 2018),

Awards
 2014 – Strange Horizons Readers Choice Award in poetry with Bryan Thao Worra.
 2010 – Lao American Illustrator Award, Lao Professionals of Elgin
 2008 – iPhone web app Staff Picks (CHORD-C.com web app)
 1999 – Yahoo! Site of the Week (Encyclopædia Britannica's "Discovering Dinosaurs" Spotlight Site)

External links
 
 Nor Sanavongsay at about.me
 Sahtu Press: About Us
 Art of Nor tumblr
 Laotian Family Returns To Region Years After A Local Church Sponsored Their Trip To America
 Little Laos on the Prairie: Bringing Xieng Mieng To Lao American Children
 Strange Horizons: Full Metal Hanuman with Bryan Thao Worra and Nor Sanavongsay
 Vita MN: Double Book Launch Showcases Twin Cities Lao Writers
 Lao American Artist Bringing Children’s Classic To Life
 DePaul University Nor Sanavongsay Interview by Sittha Abhay
 Laotian Writers Society: Nor Sanavongsay to Attend Lao American Writers Summit
 Laos In The House Profile: Nor Sanavongsay

American people of Laotian descent
People from Elgin, Illinois
Northern Illinois University alumni
People from Kingsport, Tennessee
Laotian writers
1975 births
Living people
American writers of Laotian descent
Writers from Illinois
People from Dublin, California